L'Armentera is a municipality in the comarca of Alt Empordà, Girona, Catalonia, Spain, on the coastline of the Costa Brava.

References

External links

 Government data pages 

Municipalities in Alt Empordà